The Temple is a painting made in 1949 by Paul Delvaux. It depicts a classical temple building in moonlight, with the severed head of a statue and several modern objects in the foreground. The painting was made in Choisel outside Paris where Delvaux lived for nine months with his lover and future wife Tam. Its combination of classical elements and modern objects was inspired by the works of Giorgio de Chirico. The Temple is in a private collection and was last sold in 2012.

Background
The Belgian painter Paul Delvaux made The Temple in 1949 during his nine-month stay at his art dealer Claude Spaak's house in Choisel outside Paris. The period was important in Delvaux's personal life and career, as he lived there with his lover and future wife Tam, on her savings and with little financial resources. In addition to The Temple, Delvaux's more prominent paintings from this period include Woman at the Temple, The Annunciation and Ecce Homo.

Subject and composition
The Temple is painted in oil and has the dimensions . It depicts a classical temple building seen from the front in moonlight. The intact temple has a frieze and pediment decorated with sculptures. Its cella—the inner temple room—is lit up and features a large female cult statue at the back.

In the foreground is a wooden crate. On top of it, to the left, is a sculpted woman's head, wearing a tiara and a bridal veil. The head is severed at the neck and there is a brooch pin close to it. To the right on top of the box is a burning modern oil lamp. Nearby is a purple bow with three hatpins. In the background is the sea, also illuminated by the moon.

Analysis and reception
Many of Delvaux's most famous paintings were made in the late 1940s and they often combine depictions of women, in many cases naked, with classical architecture, creating an irrational encounter between classical antiquity and the modern world. Important influences here include the painter Giorgio de Chirico's evocations of his childhood in Greece and the ancient Mediterranean region, and the surrealist celebration of the chance encounter between unrelated objects. In her 2012 lot essay about The Temple for the auction firm Christie's, Adrienne Dumas says the combination of classical fragments and modern objects in The Temple is reminiscent of Le Rêve Transformé (1913) and The Song of Love (1914) by Chirico. According to Dumas, The Temple is similar to many Chirico paintings in that it portrays a "strange or disjunctive antiquity", which creates a sense of crisis in a disjointed contemporary world, and simultaneously evokes "lyrical mystery and enduring power" that connect the past and the present.

Oil lamps are a recurring motif in Delvaux's paintings. In addition to The Temple, they appear in an ancient setting in The Lamps (1937), outside an abandoned train station in Horizons (1960), paving a walkway in All the Lights (1962), and carried by women in The Cortege (1963), The Acropolis (1966) and Chrysis (1967). Delvaux said they had been part of his original break with rationalism: "When I dared paint a Roman triumphal arch with, on the ground, lighted lamps, the decisive step had been taken. ... Painting could, I realised, have a meaning of its own, it confirmed in a very special way its capacity to play a major emotional role."

The art historian and archaeologist  says The Temple, like Delvaux's paintings in general, has no direct message to decipher, but it does have a "network of signifiers" associated with classical sculpture. He says it is significant that the temple, its decorations and cult statue are intact. Although the head in the foreground has been severed from the body, "it lives from the brilliance of its intact colours". Jockey contrasts this with an earlier painting by Delvaux,  (1935), which shows a toppled and damaged female statue surrounded by stone fragments, and highlights the absence of melancholy and longing for the past in The Temple. The art historian Virginie Devillers likens the crate to an altar and says the painting expresses the beauty and enchantment of light, especially moonlight. She says it uses juxtaposition to turn familiar objects into matters of poetry and connect them to the temple, a "monumental, absolute apparition". The art historian  called The Temple "one of the most powerful of Delvaux's nocturnal visions".

Provenance
The Temple was initially bought by Jean–Louis Merckx in Brussels. It has been exhibited at the Sidney Janis Gallery in New York. By 1969, it belonged to Mrs Robiliart in Brussels and later a private collector in Geneva. In 1990 it was part of an exhibition at the Gallery Ueda in Tokyo. A private collector who purchased it in 2004 sold it through Christie's on 20 June 2012 for 1,609,250 pounds sterling.

References

Citations

Sources
 
 
 
 

1949 paintings
Paintings by Paul Delvaux
Architecture paintings
Moon in art